Catherine Peyretone (1475–1519) was a French alleged witch. Her case was an early one, as the European witch hunt did not fully take place before the second half of the 16th century. It was somewhat uncommon for the Inquisition to execute people for witchcraft, as they normally focused in heresy, and witch trials were often handled by secular authorities. 

She was investigated by the French Inquisition for witchcraft in Montpezat in 1519. 

She was sentenced to death for witchcraft, having confessed to a pact and sexual intercourse with Satan, and was burned at the stake.

References

1519 deaths
People executed by France by burning
16th-century executions by France
French people executed for witchcraft
Witch trials in France
Victims of the Inquisition